Death on the Oxford Road is a 1933 detective novel by E.C.R. Lorac, the pen name of the British writer Edith Caroline Rivett. It is the fifth book featuring Chief Inspector MacDonald of Scotland Yard who appeared in a lengthy series of novels during the Golden Age of Detective Fiction.

Synopsis
On a dark night on a lonely spot on the Oxford Road a body is dumped out of a motor car. Unfortunately for the murderers MacDonald happens to be close by and leads the investigation that will eventually catch them.

References

Bibliography
 Cooper, John & Pike, B.A. Artists in Crime: An Illustrated Survey of Crime Fiction First Edition Dustwrappers, 1920-1970. Scolar Press, 1995.
 Hubin, Allen J. Crime Fiction, 1749-1980: A Comprehensive Bibliography. Garland Publishing, 1984.
 Nichols, Victoria & Thompson, Susan. Silk Stalkings: More Women Write of Murder. Scarecrow Press, 1998.
 Reilly, John M. Twentieth Century Crime & Mystery Writers. Springer, 2015.

1933 British novels
British mystery novels
Novels by E.C.R. Lorac
Novels set in England
British detective novels
Sampson Low books